King's Mill or King's Mills may refer to:

King's Mill, Shipley, windmill
King's Mill, Castle Donington, watermill
Kings Mill, Stamford, watermill
King's Mills, a specific faraway location "at the ends of the earth", mentioned by Melville in Moby Dick
 King's Mill, Toronto

See also
King's Mill Hospital
Kings Mills, Ohio